Pike County is a county in the southwest portion of the U.S. state of Indiana. As of the 2010 United States census, the population was 12,845. The county seat is Petersburg. It contains the geographic point representing median center of US population in 2010.

Pike County is part of the Jasper Micropolitan Statistical Area.

History
In 1787, the fledgling United States defined the Northwest Territory, which included the area of present-day Indiana. In 1800, Congress separated Ohio from the Northwest Territory, designating the rest of the land as the Indiana Territory. President Thomas Jefferson chose William Henry Harrison as the territory's first governor, and Vincennes was established as the territorial capital. After the Michigan Territory was separated and the Illinois Territory was formed, Indiana was reduced to its current size and geography. On 11 December 1816, the Indiana Territory was admitted to the Union as a state.

Starting in 1794, Native American titles to Indiana lands were extinguished by usurpation, purchase, or war and treaty. The United States acquired land from the Native Americans in the Vincennes Tract, in the 1804 Treaty of Vincennes, and in the 1809 treaty of Fort Wayne . These various dealings resolved the occupation issue for the future Pike County. Whites had been settling in the future county's terrain since 1800 (the first was Woolsey Pride, at White Oak Springs).

The area of present-day Pike County was first placed under local jurisdiction in 1790, when Knox County was created. This all-encompassing county was repeatedly subdivided as its lands were occupied − on 1 April 1813 the County of Gibson was authorized from the SW portion of Knox County, and four weeks later another portion of Knox was partitioned to create Warrick County. On 1 November 1814, portions of Warrick and Gibson were partitioned to create Perry County. Two years later, the northern portions of Gibson and Perry were sufficiently populated to warrant a separate governing structure, so on 21 December 1816 − ten days after being admitted to the Federal Union as a state − the Indiana state legislature authorized the creation of Pike County, taking areas from Gibson, Knox, and Perry counties. The first commissioners filed a report dated 15 February 1817, naming Petersburg as the seat of government; the city was laid out and platted that same year. The city was named for Peter Brenton, an original owner of the town site. A post office was put into service at Petersburg in 1823.

Pike County was named for Zebulon Pike, famous for his Pike Expedition of 1806–1807, exploring the southwest portion of the Louisiana Purchase. Pike commanded the 4th Infantry Regiment at the Battle of Tippecanoe in 1811. He was killed as a brigadier general during the War of 1812 after his men had captured York (now Toronto), Canada.

The first courthouse in Pike County was a two-story log building, laid on the east side of the Petersburg public square in 1817. It remained in use until replaced by a two-story brick building in 1834. The third courthouse was a larger two-story structure, built in 1868; the present building was erected in 1922.

From 1959 to 1963 Vance Hartke and Homer E. Capehart were the U.S. senators for Indiana, both from Pike County.

In 2015, northern Pike County's economy received a boost from the completion of Interstate 69.

Geography
The low hills of Pike County have been cleared, leveled, and put to agricultural use, although its many drainages are still wooded. The highest point on the terrain ( ASL) is the sharp crest of a ridge  NE of Stendal. Like many counties along or near the Ohio River, large portions of Pike County had been strip mined. Most of these areas have been restored, but many remain.

The county's northern boundary is defined by the westward-flowing White River. The Patoka River also flows westward through the lower central part of the county, and forms a portion of the county's west boundary line with Gibson County.

Adjacent counties

 Daviess County − northeast
 Dubois County − east
 Warrick County − south/CT Border
 Gibson County − west/CT Border
 Knox County − northwest

Major highways

  Interstate 69

Protected areas
 Columbia Mine Preserve (part)
 Interlake State Recreation Area (part)
 Patoka River National Wildlife Refuge and Management Area (part)

City
 Petersburg

Towns
 Spurgeon
 Winslow

Census-designated place
 Otwell (named Pierceville 1855−1864)

Unincorporated places

 Alford
 Algiers
 Arda
 Arthur Junction
 Ashby Yards
 Augusta
 Ayrshire
 Bowman
 Campbelltown
 Cato
 Chandler
 Coats Spring
 Coe
 Enos Corner
 Fritz Corner
 Glezen
 Hartwell
 Highbank Town
 Iva
 Littles
 Marysville
 Muren
 Oatsville
 Pikeville
 Rogers
 Rumble
 Scottsburg
 Stendal
 Survant
 Union
 Velpen
 West Petersburg
 White Sulphur Springs
 Whiteoak
 Willisville
 Zoar

Townships

 Clay
 Jefferson
 Lockhart
 Logan
 Madison
 Marion
 Monroe
 Patoka
 Washington

Climate and weather

Government

The county government is a constitutional body, and is granted specific powers by the Constitution of Indiana, and by the Indiana Code.

County Council: The legislative branch of the county government; controls spending and revenue collection in the county. Representatives are elected to four-year terms from county districts. They set salaries, the annual budget, and special spending. The council has limited authority to impose local taxes, in the form of an income and property tax that is subject to state level approval, excise taxes, and service taxes.

Board of Commissioners: The executive body of the county; commissioners are elected county-wide to staggered four-year terms. One commissioner serves as president. The commissioners execute acts legislated by the council, collect revenue, and manage the county government.

Court: The county maintains a Circuit Court (83rd Judicial Circuit) and has a small claims division which division handles family law cases as well. The judge of the Circuit Court is elected to a term of six years and must be a member in good standing of the Indiana Bar. The judge is assisted by a referee in the small claims\family division who is appointed by the Circuit Court Judge.

County Officials: The county has other elected offices, including sheriff, coroner, auditor, treasurer, recorder, surveyor, and circuit court clerk. These officers are elected to four-year terms. Members elected to county government positions are required to declare party affiliations and to be residents of the county.

Demographics

2010 census
As of the 2010 United States Census, there were 12,845 people, 5,186 households, and 3,645 families in the county. The racial makeup of the county was 98.2% white, 0.3% black or African American, 0.2% Asian, 0.2% American Indian, 0.3% from other races, and 0.8% from two or more races. Those of Hispanic or Latino origin made up 0.9% of the population. In terms of ancestry, 25.7% were American, 25.1% were German, 15.8% were Irish, and 11.4% were English.

Of the 5,186 households, 29.6% had children under the age of 18 living with them, 57.3% were married couples living together, 8.5% had a female householder with no husband present, 29.7% were non-families, and 25.5% of all households were made up of individuals. The average household size was 2.44 and the average family size was 2.90. The median age was 42.8 years.

The median income for a household in the county was $47,697 and the median income for a family was $49,423. Males had a median income of $40,952 versus $29,664 for females. The per capita income for the county was $20,005. About 9.0% of families and 12.9% of the population were below the poverty line, including 16.0% of those under age 18 and 10.0% of those age 65 or over, Making Pike County one of the poorest counties in the state.

See also
 National Register of Historic Places listings in Pike County, Indiana

References

 
Indiana counties
1816 establishments in Indiana
Populated places established in 1816
Southwestern Indiana
Jasper, Indiana micropolitan area